Lawton Jacobs (born 16 May 1961) is a South African former cricketer. He played in twenty-four first-class and three List A matches for Boland from 1973/74 to 1988/89.

See also
 List of Boland representative cricketers

References

External links
 

1961 births
Living people
South African cricketers
Boland cricketers
People from Stellenbosch
Cricketers from the Western Cape